Astra International is an Indonesian conglomerate controlled by Jardine Matheson. It was founded in 1957 by Tjia Kian Tie, Liem Pen Hong with the name of PT. Astra International Incorporated.

It is Southeast Asia's largest independent automotive group. Operating predominantly in Indonesia, it is a provider of a full range of automobile and motorcycle products in partnerships with companies which include Toyota, Daihatsu, Isuzu, UD Trucks, Peugeot and BMW for automobiles, and Honda for motorcycles. Astra also has a strong presence in the automotive component sector through its subsidiary PT Astra Otoparts Tbk.

In addition, Astra has interests in financial services; heavy equipment and mining; agribusiness; infrastructure and logistics; and information technology. In financial services, Astra's businesses provide financial products and services to support its automotive and heavy equipment sales. The group was also involved in retail banking through a stake in PT Bank Permata Tbk until the late 2010s. In 2019, Astra invested US$150 million in application-based, on-demand service Gojek.

See also
 Astra Daihatsu Motor
 Astra Honda Motor
 Isuzu Astra Motor Indonesia
 Toyota Astra Motor
 United Tractors

References

External links
 Official website

Financial services companies established in 1957
Auto dealerships
Companies based in Jakarta
Conglomerate companies established in 1957
Conglomerate companies of Indonesia
Holding companies established in 1957
Jardine Matheson Group
Car manufacturers of Indonesia
Vehicle manufacturing companies established in 1957
Indonesian companies established in 1957
1990 initial public offerings
Companies listed on the Indonesia Stock Exchange